The men's team épée was one of four fencing events on the Fencing at the 1908 Summer Olympics programme.  The event was won by the French team, who also swept the medals in the individual épée event. Each nation could enter a team of up to 8 fencers, with 4 fencers chosen for each match.

Competition format

The tournament used a variant of the Bergvall system, holding a single elimination bracket for the gold medal with a repechage ending in a match for silver and bronze. Each match featured 4 fencers from one team facing 4 fencers from the other team, for a total of 16 individual bouts. Bouts were to 1 touch, with double-touches counting against both fencers.

With 9 teams, the main bracket consisted of a single "play-in" match in what would typically be considered the round of 16, followed by quarterfinals, semifinals, and a final. Teams defeated by the gold medalist in the main bracket moved to the repechage. With 3 teams in the repechage, a repechage "semifinal" and "final" (which awarded the silver medal to the winner and bronze medal to the loser) were held.

Results

Main bracket

Play-in match

The first bout was a play-in match between the United Kingdom and the Netherlands.

First round

Winners advanced, losers out.  The team that was defeated by the eventual champions moved to the repechage.

Semifinals

Winners advanced to play for the gold medal, loser to eventual champion was sent to repechage.

Final

The winner received the gold medal, while the loser had to play the winner of the repechage in the silver medal match.

Repechage

Round 1

Denmark and Great Britain had been defeated by France, the winner of the final, in the first two rounds.  The two teams faced each other for the right to advance to the silver medal match against the loser of the final.

Silver medal match

The winner took the silver medal, with loser receiving bronze.  The final three individual bouts of the match were not played, as Belgium was then down by 4 and unable to tie up the contest.  Under Rule 50 of the competition, the decision whether to continue or not was given to the Belgian team captain, who elected not to finish the contest.

References

Sources
 
 De Wael, Herman. Herman's Full Olympians: "Fencing 1908". Accessed 1 May 2006.

Men's team epee